Hamza Haoudi (born 9 March 2001) is an Italian professional footballer who plays as a forward for  side Turris on loan from Frosinone.

Career
On 2 July 2021, Haoudi signed for Serie B side Frosinone. On 1 September 2022, Haoudi joined Turris on a season-long loan.

Personal life 
Haoudi was born in Italy and is of Moroccan heritage.

Club statistics

Club

Notes

References

2001 births
Italian people of Moroccan descent
Italian sportspeople of African descent
Sportspeople from Lucca
Living people
Italian footballers
Association football forwards
U.S. Livorno 1915 players
Frosinone Calcio players
S.S. Turris Calcio players
Eccellenza players
Serie B players
Serie C players
21st-century Italian people